Baba Singh may refer to:

 Baba Bujha Singh (died 1970), Indian revolutionary leader
 Baba Darbara Singh (1644–1734), second Jathedar of Khalsa Panth Budha Dal (1716–1734)
 Baba Deep Singh (1682–1757), martyr in Sikhism
 Baba Dyal Singh (1783–1855)
 Baba Gurdit Singh (1860–1954), central figure in the Komagata Maru incident of 1914
 Baba Gurmukh Singh (1888–1977), Ghadr revolutionary and a Sikh leader
 Baba Harbhajan Singh (1946–1968), Indian army soldier
 Baba Hardev Singh, also known as Nirankari Baba (1954–2016), Indian spiritual teacher
 Baba Kashmira Singh, head of the Sidhant Sant Samaj/Gurbani (Gurmati) Sidhant Pracharak Sant Samaj, a pro-Gurmat organization in Jalandhar, India
 Baba Kharak Singh (1867–1963), Sikh political leader
 Baba Sewa Singh, Indian social worker and environmentalist
 Baba Sucha Singh, Indian politician
 Baba Umad Singh (fl. 19th century), spiritual leader in Rajasthan, India